Albert, born in Normandy, was taken to Motta Montecorvino in Apulia, Italy as a child. He later became Bishop there. Albert became blind in later years, but was known for his visions and as a miracle worker.

Notes

Italian Roman Catholic saints
French Roman Catholic saints
12th-century Christian saints
12th-century Italian Roman Catholic bishops
1127 deaths
Year of birth unknown